Demsa is a Local Government Area of Adamawa State, Nigeria with headquarters located in Demsa. Demsa lies on the Benue River.

History 
Demsa Local Government Area is one of the twenty one LGAs in Adamawa State and has the postal code of 642.

The LGA administrative office is situated in Demsa Town and has the incumbent LGA Chairman as the head while the Chiefs are the head of the respective communities that made up the town, and the Councillors being the representatives of each wards that made up the community.

Population 
Population is 180,251. It is inhabited by ethnic groups such as the Bachama (Bwatiye)Batta, Yandang, Bille, Mbula, Maya, Bare and fulani.

Languages
The languages spoken in Demsa LGA are,
Bacama
Bali
Bata
Bille
Mbula-Bwazza

Government

References 

Local Government Areas in Adamawa State